Denis Joseph Oullahan (1824 – November 5, 1889) served as California State Treasurer 1884–1887.

Career
He was late the Democratic delegate for San Joaquin County 1873–1889.  
He also served in the military with the Montgomery Guard located in San Francisco.  He was Captain; elected January 22, 1864; commissioned February 9, 1864.

References

Sources

State treasurers of California
1824 births
Date of birth missing
1889 deaths